On The Road is the second live album (two LPs on initial European releases; later reissued on one CD) by English rock band Traffic, released in 1973. Recorded live in Germany, it features the Shoot Out at the Fantasy Factory band, with the Muscle Shoals Rhythm Section of keyboardist Barry Beckett, bassist David Hood, and drummer Roger Hawkins.

The initial U.S. release of On the Road (Island/Capitol) was a single LP consisting of "The Low Spark of High Heeled Boys" (edited to 15:10), "Shoot Out at the Fantasy Factory", "(Sometimes I Feel So) Uninspired", and "Light Up or Leave Me Alone".

The album reached number 40 in the UK and number 29 in the USA.

Reception
In their retrospective review, Allmusic praised the playing of Roger Hawkins, David Hood, and Barry Beckett, but condemned the album for both stretching the songs out for too long and failing to improve on the "lackluster" studio versions of the three songs from Shoot Out at the Fantasy Factory.

Track listing

U.S. & Canada LP track listing

Personnel
Steve Winwood – guitar, lead vocals (1, 3, 4, 6), piano
Chris Wood – flute, saxophone
Jim Capaldi – percussion, lead vocals (5), backing vocals, drums (4)
Rebop Kwaku Baah – congas, percussion
Barry Beckett – organ, piano
David Hood – bass
Roger Hawkins – drums

Production notes:
Chris Blackwell – producer
Brian Humphries – engineer
Jimmy Johnson – mixing
Jeff Willens – mastering
Ann Borthwick – cover art
Brian Cooke – photography

Charts

References

Traffic (band) albums
1973 live albums
Albums produced by Chris Blackwell
Island Records live albums